Iceland sent a delegation to compete at the 2010 Winter Paralympics, in Vancouver, British Columbia, Canada. The country thus made its return to the Winter Paralympics after a sixteen-year absence; its only prior participation had been in 1994.

Iceland fielded a single athlete, in alpine skiing.

Alpine skiing 

Erna Friðriksdóttir was Iceland's sole representative in alpine skiing.

In the slalom, she completed the first run, crashed twice during the second and struggled to pick herself up, eventually reaching the finish line. She was recorded as disqualified for her second run, however.

See also
Iceland at the 2010 Winter Olympics
Iceland at the Paralympics

References

External links
Vancouver 2010 Paralympic Games official website
International Paralympic Committee official website

Nations at the 2010 Winter Paralympics
2010
Paralympics